Jewish American Heritage Month (JAHM) is an annual recognition and celebration of American Jews' achievements and contributions to the United States of America during the month of May. 

President George W. Bush first proclaimed the month on April 20, 2006, as a result of cooperation with Sen. Arlen Specter (R-PA), as well as the Jewish Museum of Florida and the South Florida Jewish Community. Since then, annual proclamations have been made by Presidents Bush, Obama, Trump, and Biden

In 2020 the National Museum of American Jewish History in Philadelphia repositioned Jewish American Heritage Month to empower communities across the country to celebrate the inspiring history of Jewish people in America; educate diverse public audiences about Jewish culture; and spark crucial conversations about the American Jewish present and future.

Purpose

In April 2006, President George W. Bush announced that May 2006 would be considered Jewish American Heritage Month. The announcement followed urging by the Jewish Museum of Florida and South Florida Jewish Community for a celebration of Jewish Americans and Jewish American Heritage.

The president wanted to proclaim a month that would recognize the more than 350-year history of Jewish contributions to America and the American culture. On February 14, 2006, Congress issued House Concurrent Resolution 315 which stated:

"Resolved ... that Congress urges the President to issue each year a proclamation calling on State and local governments and the people of the United States to observe an American Jewish History Month with appropriate programs, ceremonies, and activities."

The concurrent resolution (i.e., a non-binding legislative measure that lacks the force of law, appropriate when a law is not necessary—such as awards or recognitions) was passed unanimously, first in the United States House of Representatives in December 2005 and later in the United States Senate in February 2006.

The Jewish American Heritage Month Coalition states that, "JAHM also enables the exploration of the meaning of religious pluralism, cultural diversity, and participation in American civic culture."

According to Library of Congress hosted website, JewishHeritageMonth.gov, May was chosen as the month of Jewish American Heritage Month because of the successful 350th Anniversary Celebration of Jews in America marking the Jewish arrival in New Amsterdam.

In 2020, the National Museum of American Jewish History successfully pivoted Jewish American Heritage Month to online programming and launched a website with the support of more than 50 organizations around the country, forging ahead even in the era of COVID-19.

Celebration and recognition 

JAHM has been recognized in Madison Square Garden in New York City. It has also been recognized in some Jewish museums.  Additionally, some institutions, including the Library of Congress, have included shorter periods within the month for special lectures, programs, or displays, such as the Library of Congress "Jewish Heritage Week" lecture series.

A similar month exists in Florida as Florida Jewish History Month but it occurs in January.

2010 White House reception
On May 10, 2010, the White House issued a press release noting that on Thursday, May 27, 2010,

The month serves as an opportunity to highlight and celebrate the range and depth of Jewish American heritage and contributions to American culture, with guests representing the many walks of life that have helped weave the fabric of American history.  Invitees include a range of community leaders and prominent Jewish Americans from Olympians and professional athletes to members of Congress, business leaders, scholars, military veterans, and astronauts.

At the May 27, 2010, reception, President Obama welcomed the invited guests, which included "members of the House and Senate, two justices of the Supreme Court, Olympic athletes, entrepreneurs, Rabbinical scholars", and he made special mention of Sandy Koufax, famous in the Jewish community for refusing to play baseball on Yom Kippur. He praised "the diversity of talents and accomplishments" that the Jewish community had brought to the United States since pre-Revolutionary times, saying that, "Even before we were a nation, we were a sanctuary for Jews seeking to live without the specter of violence or exile," from the time "a band of 23 Jewish refugees to a place called New Amsterdam more than 350 years ago."

2011 White House reception

President Obama scheduled a second White House reception in honor of JAHM for May 17, 2011.  The Jewish Telegraphic Agency (JTA) reported that it was "less formal than the inaugural one last year, with brief remarks and a small Marine Corps band playing klezmer music." The President noted the presence, among others, of Nobel Peace Prize Laureate Elie Wiesel, and Representative Debbie Wasserman Schultz, newly appointed as Chair of the Democratic National Committee.

In his remarks, President Obama noted that Jewish Americans "persevered despite unspeakable discrimination and adversity at times."  Despite the challenges these American Jews faced, the President noted their achievements in "the arts, science, the military, business and industry, and in public and community service." In his remarks, he said:

In addition, a Marine Corps band playing klezmer music, and the "Maccabeats," a Yeshiva University a cappella group, provided entertainment.

2015 Presidential synagogue visit

In addition to signing the proclamation marking May 2015 as the annual Jewish American Heritage Month, the White House shared plans for an address by President Obama on May 22, 2015, at Adas Israel Congregation, a large Washington, D.C. synagogue. The date of the visit coincides with "Solidarity Sabbath," a Lantos Foundation for Human Rights and Justice initiative asking world leaders to show support for the fight against anti-semitism.

JAHM Coalition

Since 2006, JAHM programs have taken place across the country, but in March 2007 the JAHM Coalition was formed and convened by United Jewish Communities (now The Jewish Federations of North America), The Jacob Rader Marcus Center of the American Jewish Archives, the Jewish Women's Archive (JWA), (AJA) and the American Jewish Historical Society (AJHS), to encourage and support future programs. The JAHM Coalition is composed of the directors of major national Jewish historical and cultural organizations including the AJA, AJHS, JWA, the National Museum of American Jewish History, the Council of American Jewish Museums (CAJM), Jewish Museum of Florida, and the Jewish Historical Society of Greater Washington. In 2009, the Coalition named a national coordinator.

JAHM Today

Jewish American Heritage Month is organized annually by the National Museum of American Jewish History as a nationwide celebration.

See also 
 
Jewish Americans
List of Jewish members of the United States Congress
South Florida Jewish Community
White House Hanukkah Party

References

External links 

JAHM - Jewish American Heritage Month Coalition
American Jewish Historical Society
Jewish Women's Archive resources for JAHM
Short article on the archaeology of immigrant California Jews see Chapter 3.
Resources > Jewish communities > America > Northern America The Jewish History Resource Center, Project of the Dinur Center for Research in Jewish History, The Hebrew University of Jerusalem
Feinstein Center. Comprehensive collection of links to Jewish American history, organizations, and issues.
Jews in America from the Jewish Virtual Library
Jewish-American Literature
Thoughts About The Jewish People By American Thinkers
Jewish-American History on the Web
Jewish American Hall of Fame
The Jewish Impact on America
Jewish Success In The American Media
Jewish American Heritage Month News
White House Video of 2010 President Obama's remarks at JAHM White House reception.
Presidential proclamation for 2011 JAHM.
Jewish American Heritage Collection in the American Archive of Public Broadcasting.

Jews and Judaism in the United States
May observances
Commemorative months
Observances in the United States